The summer of 2013–14 was at the time, the most destructive bushfire season in terms of property loss since the 2008–09 Australian bushfire season, with the loss of 371 houses and several hundred non-residential buildings as a result of wild fires between 1 June 2015 and 31 May 2016. The season also suffered 4 fatalities; 2 died in New South Wales, 1 in Western Australia and 1 in Victoria. One death was as a direct result of fire, 2 died due to unrelated health complications while fighting fires on their property, and a pilot contracted by the NSW Rural Fire Service died during an accident.

Climate summary and predictions 

The season was predicted to have above average fire potential for most states including portions of the north west of Western Australia, the north west of the Northern Territory and large areas of central Queensland following below average rainfall and above average temperatures in these areas in the months leading up to the fire season. The year 2013 was the hottest on record in Australia, with the average temperature from September 2012 to August 2013 being calculated to be  which is 1.1 °C (1.6 °F) higher than the 1961 to 1990 average.

Fires of note

† – A series of separate fires in close proximity.

Fires by state or territory

New South Wales

September

During August and September a total 2,322 active fires were recorded across the state.

On 9–10 September, 59 fires ignited around the western suburbs of Sydney during one of the earliest starts to a fire season in several years. A  fire in Marsden Park destroyed one house and several sheds. Three houses were damaged and a Western Sydney University campus was evacuated as a result of other fires burning near Castlereagh, Londonderry and Windsor Downs. Approximately 800 firefighters and 200 appliances attended the blazes; two firefighters were injured while combating the Marsden Park blaze and another five were treated for smoke inhalation.

On 28 September, a fire ignited on Barrenjoey headland, destroying 60 percent of the scrub and forest on the headland and damaging the roof of the cottage attached to historic Barrenjoey Head Lighthouse and a second building in the lighthouse complex. Approximately 80 firefighters and three aircraft were required to bring the blaze under control by the following day. Communities around Taree were also threatened by fire on 28 September; several sheds and outbuildings were destroyed by a blaze that burned .

Another fire ignited in coal tailings from local mining operations near Ruttleys Rd., Doyalson, during September; the hot-spots were observed by the RFS several weeks before, but could not be extinguished before hot conditions on 17 October.

October

During October 2013, 1,162 fires were recorded in New South Wales, 19 of these being declared major incidents.

On 13 October, a small grass fire burned through the car park of the Aquatic Centre at Sydney Olympic Park, near the Rural Fire Service Headquarters, destroying 47 cars and a motorbike and damaging a further 33. The evacuation plan of the Aquatic Centre
was employed and 500 to 1,500 people were safely moved away from danger by staff of the complex where the 2013 Buffalo Sports NSW All Schools Championships were taking place. On the same day, two houses were destroyed and another damaged by a  fire that ignited in the Webbs Creek area, west of Gosford.

Three fires ignited around the Port Stephens area on 13 October, destroying a total of 4 houses, 9 industrial/commercial/primary production buildings, 24 outbuildings and eight vehicles over a 10-day period; a further 9 houses and 10 industrial/commercial/primary production buildings were significantly damaged, also. The first fire, near Fingal Bay, burned . The second fire, ignited by powerlines arcing in high winds near Brownes Rd. and Lemon Tree Passage Rd. in Salt Ash, burned  and destroyed four houses, a number of sheds, outbuildings, vehicles and boats. More than 500 residents registered for assistance at the King Park, Raymond Terrace bushfire evacuation centre during the Hank St. fire.

On 16 October, a fire—later referred to as the State Mine fire—ignited on the grounds of the Marangaroo Army base during an explosives exercise. Firefighters were unable to combat the fire due to the danger of unexploded ordnance in the area and the presence of a no fly zone above the base. The blaze rapidly spread into rugged, largely inaccessible, country containing heavy fuel loads. Over a period of four weeks, the fire burned through  of scrub and forest, the majority in Wollemi and Blue Mountains National Parks. Significant damage was caused to the infrastructure of the historic Zig Zag Railway, estimated to have cost A$3–4 million; eleven engines and carriages and numerous structures for accommodation and administration were destroyed.

The most destructive single bushfire in terms of property loss in the history of New South Wales ignited in the vicinity of Linksview Rd., Springwood, at about midday on 17 October. A significant amount of destruction occurred in the initial hours of the fire around Buena Vista Rd., Emma Pde., Heather Glen Rd., Moray St. and Purvines Rd. A number of houses were also destroyed in Paulwood Ave., close to St. Thomas Aquinas Primary School, which was evacuated to Winmalee Shopping Centre and destruction also occurred on Singles Ridge Rd., where the children of Rainbow Pre-School were evacuated and the playground was destroyed.

Also on 17 October, two other significant fires ignited; one near Mt. York Rd. in Mount Victoria and another near Hall Rd. in Balmoral.

Over 22-day period the 'Mt. York Rd.' fire burned  of scrub and forest, the majority within the boundaries of the Blue Mountains National Park. All property losses occurred on the first afternoon of the blaze; 10 houses were destroyed and a further 3 were damaged in St. George's Parade, Mount Victoria, and a number of smaller structures and vehicles were destroyed in other streets around the town. From 18 to 24 October, there was concern that the fire could enter the Grose Valley and impact on Katoomba and the lower Blue Mountains, however a  containment line, constructed by specialized and experienced RFS Remote Areas Firefighting Teams in a narrow ravine, prevented the fire from entering.

Over a 26-day period the 'Hall Rd.' fire burned  of forest within the Upper Nepean State Conservation Area and impacted the communities of Balmoral, Cordeaux-Dam and Yanderra; 2 houses were destroyed and another 2 were damaged. The fire had a significant effect on infrastructure, closing the Hume Motorway—creating a traffic jam reputed to have been  in length—and disrupting electrical supply to the water filtration plant for the Upper Nepean Catchment, which services four dams of Sydney's Water Catchment. Also threatened were Cordeaux colliery, a gas pipeline and communications tower.

January

On 17 January, at least 50 fires were ignited in New South Wales by lightning strikes. The most destructive of these blazes burned  in and around Murraguldrie State Forest and impacted upon the communities of Carabost, Humula, Kyeamba and Little Billabong over a period of days; 5 houses and a number of non-residential structures were destroyed. Significant damage was also caused to local forestry, costing about A$3 million to replace.

Queensland 

December & January

At least 850 campers were evacuated from Main Beach on 1 January and residents between Gatumba St. and Beehive Rd. were evacuated on 4 January after a fire near Myora broke containment lines. Significant damage was caused to power infrastructure and the majority of settlements on the island lost power, however no houses were destroyed in the blaze.

South Australia 

December

Over  of grassland was burned and a hay shed was destroyed.

January

On 14 January, lightning ignited a number of serious fires across the state. During a 31-day period, the fire burned  of scrub, forest and pasture and impacted the communities of Bangor, Laura, Stone Hut and Wirrabara; 5 houses, a timber mill, a number of sheds and 75% of the pine plantation in Wirrabara Forest were destroyed and at least 700 head of livestock died. 24 minor injuries were recorded by Country Fire Service personnel, most involving smoke inhalation and heat exhaustion. A second destructive fire also ignited near Rockleigh, in the Murray Bridge municipality, and burned through open country into scrubland. During a 4-day period, the fire burned  of land; 1 house and significant quantities of feed, water and fencing were destroyed. Other fires ignited the same day near Ceduna and burned at least  of land within Pureba, Yellabinna, Yumbarra and Watraba Conservation Parks over a 4-day period.

Just after midday on 17 January, a fire ignited from a rekindle of a lightning strike in the Eden Valley. During a 16-day period, the fire burned  of scrub, forest and pasture and impacted the communities of Angaston, Cambrai, Keyneton, Sedan, Springton and Truro; 4 houses and significant quantities of feed, water and fencing were destroyed.

Victoria 

Between 7 November and 11 March, Total Fire Bans were declared in all or parts of the state on 17 days.

January

The most destructive fire in terms of property loss during the Victorian season ignited on 14 January near Pohlners Rd., Wartook, and burned into the Grampians National Park. On 17 January, the body of a civilian woman was found in a property at Roses Gap—her death was confirmed to have been fire related. Two additional civilians were admitted to hospital with injuries related to the fire.

The largest fire during the Victorian season ignited on 16 January as a number of separate fires—the 'Goongerah complex' and 'Club Terrace' fires being the most serious—in mountainous terrain of the Snowy River and Errinundra National Parks in the East Gippsland region. A significant commitment of aircraft, including 9 helicopters and 5 fixed-wing aircraft, supported by an additional 6 RFS aircraft provided during February, were deployed to the fires in the remote region.

A second complex of fires also ignited north of Glenaladale on 16 January. During a 67-day period, the blaze burned  of forest within the Mitchell River National Park and on private property, as well as impacting the communities of Fernbank, Fingerboards, Glenaladale and Mount Ray; 3 houses and 7 non-residential structures were destroyed and 1,000 head of livestock died.

February

Strong winds and high temperatures of on 9 February lead to the ignition of 78 separate fires, which resulted the issuing of 150 emergency warnings during the day.

The most serious fire to start during the day ignited when a tree fell on a powerline along Mickleham Rd., Mickelham. The fire spread rapidly north and threatened 1,240 houses and 13,000 residents within the eventual footprint of the fire. At least 810 firefighters, supported by 15 aircraft, battled to contain the fire as it crossed the boundaries of 3 local government areas, and on 14 February the fire was declared under control.

The coal dredgers and conveyor belts feeding the coal-fired generators were damaged by fire and were briefly shut down, and the fire also had a significant impact to the health of residents and firefighting personnel during its 45-day duration. Of the 28 firefighting personnel who required medical assistance, 26 were treated for exposure to carbon monoxide; 14 from the CFA and 12 from GDF Suez. General practitioner practices in Churchill, Moe, Morwell and Traralgon reported an increase in consultations related to respiratory conditions, including breathing difficulties, asthma, chronic obstructive pulmonary disease exacerbation, coughing or throat irritations.
 Between 9 February and 10 March, 46 calls related to respiratory problems were taken within Morwell and Traralgon by the Nurse-On-Call service; approximately 30 more than on the same period in years prior.

Other destructive fires that ignited across the state on 9 February included;

A suspicious fire that ignited at a number of separate ignition points along Kaarima Rd. and the Goulburn Valley Hwy., Wunghnu, and burned  of scrub, forest and private property, impacting the communities of Bunbartha, Numurkah and Wunghnu.
A fire that ignited in Warrandyte and burned  of scrub and private property, impacting houses along Amersham Dr. and Glamis St. within the suburb. Although small, the fire destroyed 3 houses and damaged a number of others.
A fire that ignited north-west of the intersection of Egan's Rd. and Yarram-Morwell Rd., between Jack River and Madalya, and burned  of scrub, forest and private property, impacting the communities of Jack River, Madalya and Staceys Bridge.
A fire that ignited along Dunolly Rd., Emu, and burned  of scrub and private property, impacting properties in the area and destroying a house and a shed.

Western Australia 

January
On 12 January, a fallen powerpole blown over by gusty winds ignited a fire in the Mundaring municipality of the Perth Hills, completely destroying 57 houses and numerous non-residential buildings. A further six houses were damaged in the suburbs of Mt. Helena, Stoneville, and Parkerville.

Notes

References

Bibliography 

2013
Australian bushfire
Australian bushfire
Bushfire
Bushfire
Bush 
Bush